HMS Unruly was a Royal Navy U-class submarine built by Vickers-Armstrong at Barrow-in-Furness.  So far she has been the only ship of the Royal Navy to bear the name Unruly.

Career
Unruly spent most of her eventful wartime career in the Mediterranean, apart from a period on convoy escort duty off the North Cape. Bulgaria was loaded with supplies for the island of Kos. Unruly missed the minelayer Drache the same day. She spotted Drache several days later, but again failed to sink her.

Unruly also damaged the Italian tanker Cesco, and the Italian merchant Nicolo Tommaseo.  The damaged Nicolo Tommaseo was later sunk by Allied aircraft.  Unruly also launched failed attacks on the German merchants Erpel and Pelikan, and an unidentified Spanish merchant.

One of her most significant actions however, was the sinking of the  during the Allied invasion of Sicily.  She was attacked with four torpedoes, at least one of which hit the Italian submarine, which sank her with the loss of all 46 of her crew.  The crew of Unruly did not actually see the results of the attack, and initially believed they had missed and their target had escaped.

Unruly survived the war and was scrapped in February 1946 by Thos. W. Ward in Inverkeithing.

References

 
 
 
 
 

 

British U-class submarines
Ships built in Barrow-in-Furness
1942 ships
World War II submarines of the United Kingdom